Ayapana is a genus of perennial herbs in the family Asteraceae.

The species of Ayapana at times been classified in the genus Eupatorium.  The leaves, at least of Ayapana triplinervis, are commonly used medicinally.

 Species
Ayapana is native to South America, Central America, and the West Indies.
 Ayapana amygdalina (Lam.) R.M.King & H.Rob. - Trinidad, Central + South America
 Ayapana ecuadorensis R.M.King & H.Rob.	 - Ecuador
 Ayapana elata (Steetz) R.M.King & H.Rob.  - Peru, Panama, Costa Rica
 Ayapana haughtii R.M.King & H.Rob. - Colombia
 Ayapana herrerae R.M.King & H.Rob. - Panama
 Ayapana hylophila (B.L.Rob.) R.M.King & H.Rob.	 - Colombia
 Ayapana jaramillii R.M.King & H.Rob. - Colombia
 Ayapana lanceolata R.M.King & H.Rob. 	- Bolivia, Peru, Pará
 Ayapana lopez-palaciosii V.M.Badillo - Venezuela
 Ayapana ornithophora (B.L.Rob.) R.M.King & H.Rob. - Colombia
 Ayapana pilluanensis (Hieron.) R.M.King & H.Rob. - Venezuela, Peru
 Ayapana robinsonii S.Díaz - Colombia
 Ayapana stenolepis (Steetz) R.M.King & H.Rob. 	- Colombia, Panama, Bolivia
 Ayapana tovarensis (B.L.Rob.) R.M.King & H.Rob. - Venezuela
 Ayapana trinitensis (Kuntze) R.M.King & H.Rob.	 - Venezuela, Colombia, Trinidad
 Ayapana triplinervis (Vahl) R.M.King & H.Rob.	 - Puerto Rico, Lesser Antilles, Trinidad, French Guiana, Ecuador, northern Brazil (Amapá, Amazonas, Pará)
 Ayapana turbacensis (Hieron.) R.M.King & H.Rob. - Colombia, Ecuador

References

External links 
 

 
Asteraceae genera